Argyle is an unincorporated community in Walton County, Florida, United States. Argyle has a post office with ZIP code 32422.

History
A post office has been in operation at Argyle since 1883. The community was named after Argyle, in Scotland, the homeland of a large share of the first settlers.

References

Unincorporated communities in Walton County, Florida
Unincorporated communities in Florida